Kouadangou is a village in the Kara Region of northern Togo. 
Nearby towns and villages include Nadoba (2.8 nm), Bako Touga (2.2 nm), Koumagou(1.0 nm), Koutatiegou (1.4 nm), Koukouo Tougou (2.8 nm), Bako Samaba (1.4 nm).

References

External links
Satellite map at Maplandia.com

Populated places in Kara Region